Donong Station is a train station on the Gyeongui-Jungang Line.

References

External links
 Station information from Korail

Seoul Metropolitan Subway stations
Railway stations opened in 2005
Metro stations in Namyangju